Schefflera  is a genus of flowering plants in the family Araliaceae with 13 species native to New Zealand and some Pacific islands.

The genus is named in honor of Johann Peter Ernst von Scheffler (born in 1739), physician and botanist of Gdańsk, and later of Warsaw, who contributed plants to Gottfried Reyger for Reygers book, 'Tentamen Florae Gedanensis'.

Taxonomy
The circumscription of the genus has varied greatly. Phylogenetic studies have shown that the widely-used broad circumscription was polyphyletic, so most of its hundreds of species have been reassigned to other genera. Molecular analyses have recovered five polyphyletic clades of Schefflera, all of which are geographically isolated from one another yet share similar traits indicating parallel evolution. These clades have been split into separate genera, primarily along geographical lines, with Schefflera now consisting of thirteen species restricted to New Zealand and some Pacific islands.

The old Didymopanax Decne. & Planch., 1854 genus was resurrected in 2020 to welcome the 37 American species of Schefflera J.R. et G. Forst..

The genus has had a turbulent taxonomic history; the list of former synonyms includes:

Actinomorphe 
Actinophyllum 
Agalma 
Astropanax 
Brassaia 
Cephaloschefflera 
Crepinella 
Didymopanax 
Geopanax 
Heptapleurum 
Neocussonia 
Nesopanax 
Parapanax 
Paratropia 
Plerandra 
Sciadophyllum 
Tupidanthus

Species

Fossil record
Two fossil fruits of †Schefflera dorofeevii have been extracted from bore hole samples of the Middle Miocene fresh water deposits in Nowy Sacz Basin, West Carpathians, Poland.

References

External links

 
Apiales genera